Jin Yong-Sik (Korean:진용식) is a Korean disabled cyclist. He won two medals at the 2008 Summer Paralympics: a silver medal in the Men's Individual Pursuit and a bronze medal in the Time Trial, when he was a freshman in Korea Nazarene University at age 30. He  competed at the London 2012 Paralympic Games in the Men's Individual Pursuit. He also participated in the 2016 Summer Paralympics

References 

South Korean male cyclists
Paralympic cyclists of South Korea
Cyclists at the 2008 Summer Paralympics
Paralympic silver medalists for South Korea
Paralympic bronze medalists for South Korea
Living people
Medalists at the 2008 Summer Paralympics
Year of birth missing (living people)
Place of birth missing (living people)
Paralympic medalists in cycling